Keita Suzuki may refer to:
 Keita Suzuki (footballer, born 1981)
 Keita Suzuki (footballer, born 1997)
 Keita Suzuki (basketball)